Me and You is a 1983 studio album by Count Basie and his orchestra.

Track listing 
 "Mr. Softie" (Nat Pierce) – 5:39
 "Moten Swing" (Benny Moten) – 5:29
 "She's Funny That Way" (Neil Moret, Richard A. Whiting) – 4:20
 "Right on, Right On" (Ernie Wilkins) – 4:45
 "Me and You" (Wilkins) – 4:15
 "Crip" (Count Basie) – 7:16
 "Bridge Work" (Basie) – 4:55
 "Easy Living" (Ralph Rainger, Leo Robin) – 4:54

Personnel 
 Count Basie - piano
 Sonny Cohn - trumpet
 Dale Carley
 Steven Furtado
 Bob Summers
 Frank Szabo
 Bill Hughes - trombone
 Grover Mitchell
 Dennis Wilson
 Mitchell "Booty" Wood
 Danny Turner - alto saxophone
 Chris Woods
 Eric Dixon - tenor saxophone
 Eric Schneider
 Johnny Williams - baritone saxophone
 Freddie Green - guitar
 Cleveland Eaton - double bass
 Dennis Mackrel - drums
 Ernie Wilkins - arranger, conductor

References 

1983 albums
Count Basie Orchestra albums
Pablo Records albums
Albums arranged by Ernie Wilkins
Albums produced by Norman Granz